Grazer Athletiksport Klub (abbreviated as GAK), better known simply as Grazer AK, is an Austrian sports club based in the city of Graz in the federal state of Styria. The football section used to be one of the most popular Austrian clubs, mostly successful in the decade 1995–2005. The other sections are basketball, diving and tennis, which however all act as separate legal entities. The "GAK" football section was folded during the 2012–13 Regionalliga Mitte Season in Autumn 2012. It has since been revived and returned to Austrian Second League in 2019.

History

The beginning
The club arose from an informal association of local academics around the medical student Georg August Wagner from Prague, later a professor at the Charles University and the Charité in Berlin. Acquainted with football from his hometown, he organised the first public match in present-day Austria on 18 March 1894 in the Graz municipal park. The Grazer Athletik-Sport-Club – modeled after the Wiener AC – was established eight years later on the 72nd birthday of Emperor Francis Joseph.

European football and the golden start to the new millennium
Between 1962 and 1983 GAK has been involved in European competitions. Their first match was against Odense BK in the Cup Winners Cup in 1962. The club has made regular appearances in European cups ever since, with regular UEFA Cup appearances since the 1980s, but the highlight came on the domestic scene in 1981 when they won the Austrian Cup. The Golden years arrived in the first half of the 2000s, when they won the Austrian Cup two more times in 2000 and 2002. Their biggest success was in 2004 where they did "the double" – they managed to win the cup yet again but also the Austrian title. Their last appearance in Europe was a disappointing 5–0 away defeat to RC Strasbourg in 2005 in Round 1 of the UEFA Cup.

Financial troubles and bankruptcy
During the 2006–2007 season, 'Grazer AK' went into administration. The club was docked 28 points as a result. In the 2007–2008 season, the club was not allowed to participate in the professional leagues and was relegated to the Austrian Regional League Central. After a second bankruptcy, the club managed to achieve a settlement and accommodation with its creditors in September 2008, ensuring its survival. Soon after, the club started having difficulties again after it could not recover from its relegation to the Regionalliga Mitte and eventually was dissolved in 2012.

New start
A phoenix club was set up by the fans soon after the club was dissolved in 2012 called Grazer AC and started from the bottom tier at season 2013/14. On 14 March 2014 Grazer AC at an extraordinary meeting was considered to be a continuation of the original "GAK" in agreement with its umbrella association. After winning every single championship, the club went back to professional football for the season 2019/20, namely in the 2nd tier of the football pyramid.

Supporters

The highest attendance average reached the red jackets in the championship season 2003/2004. This season, an average of 9234 pilgrimage to the home games of the "Athletics". The average attendance since the forced descent had settled at "only" 3500, but the quality of the organized support had risen. The "curve" was in sector 22, before relegation to the Regionalliga in sector 25. Despite the third-rate fate pilgrimage several hundred fans to the away games. The ultra-fan groups are the Red Firm, the Society Graz, the Tifosi Rosso Bianco and the Everreds. Parts of the fan scene maintain friendship to KFC Uerdingen 05, NK Čelik Zenica and also SV Austria Salzburg.

Graz Derby
GAK have a big rivalry with cross-town rivals Sturm Graz with whom they contest the Graz Derby. In 1974 there was big opposition from both sets of fans against a proposed merger to become FC Graz. Since 1920, excluding the friendly matches (especially before the first official Styrian Cup in 1920), 197 matches have been played between the two, of which there were: 185 encounters in the league (130 at the professional level and 55 at amateur level in the Styrian League); an additional 5 encounters in Austrian Cup (including one final that was won by the GAK in 2002); 1 match in Austrian Supercup; 2 meetings in the Tschammerpokal and 4 games in the Styrian Cup. The very first Derby took place in 1911, the last was dated 17 May 2007.  The Red Devils are the most successful Team in the lookwise of local rivalries. In October, the 19th 2022, a long period without  when both Clubs are fighting each other at the last 16 of the ÖFB-Cup.

Past seasons
These are the seasons that the team has done since it was re-founded at the end of the year 2012.

European competition

Results

Derby statistics vs. SK Sturm Graz
(as of 23.8.2005)
Total (in 1st Austrian League):
46 Won
42 Drawn
42 Lost
(Goals: 174:168)

Current squad

Out on loan

Managerial history

 Karl Mütsch (1948–1951)
 Josef Pojar (1951–1952)
 Engelbert Smutny (1952)
 Karl Mütsch (1953–1954)
 Alfred Pestitschek (1954–1957)
  János Szép (1957–1960)
 Ferdinand Fritsch (1960–1962)
  Juan Schwanner (1962–1963)
 Fritz Pimperl (1963–1964)
 Milan Zeković (1964)
 Karl Durspekt (1964–1965)
 Karl Kowanz (1965–1967)
 Fritz Kominek (1967–1969)
 Vlado Šimunić (1969–1970)
 Karl Durspekt (1970–1971)
 Helmut Senekowitsch (1971–1973)
 Alfred Günthner (1973–1974)
 Hans Hipp (1974–1975)
 Hermann Stessl (1975–1977)
 Hermann Repitsch (interim) (1977)
 Gerd Springer (1977–1978)
 Walter Koleznik (interim) (1978)
  Václav Halama (1978–1981)
 Zlatko Čajkovski (1981–1982)
 August Starek (1982–1984)
 Helmut Senekowitsch (1984–1985)
 Gernot Fraydl (1985–1986)
 Adolf Blutsch (1986–1987)
 Adi Pinter (1987–1988)
  Václav Halama (1988–1989)
 Karl Philipp (1989)
 Adi Pinter (1989–1990)
 Heinz Binder (1990)
 Savo Ekmečić (1990–1992)
 Milan Miklavič (1992–1993)
 Hans Ulrich Thomale (1993–1996)
 Ljupko Petrović (1996)
 Hans Peter Schaller (1996)
 August Starek (1996–1997)
 Klaus Augenthaler (1997–2000)
 Rainer Hörgl (2000)
 Werner Gregoritsch (2000–2001)
 Christian Keglevits (2001)
Thijs Libregts (2001–2002)
 Christian Keglevits (2002)
 Walter Schachner (2002–2006)
 Lars Søndergaard (2006–2007)
 Dietmar Pegam (2007)
 Stojadin Rajković (2008)
 Gregor Pötscher (2008–2010)
 Heinz Karner (2010)
 Peter Stöger (2010–2011)
 Aleš Čeh (2011–2012)
 Ante Šimundža (2012)
 David Preiß (9 October 2017 – 25 February 2020)
 Gernot Plassnegger (2020–present)

Honours

Austrian Bundesliga (I)
Winners (1): 2003–04
Runners-up (2): 2002–03, 2004–05

Austrian Cup
Winners (4): 1980–81, 1999–2000, 2001–02, 2003–04
Runners-up (2): 1961–62, 1967–68

Austrian Supercup
Winners (2): 2000, 2002
Runners-up (1): 2004

Austrian First League (II)
Winners (3): 1974–75, 1992–93, 1994–95

Austrian Regionalliga Mitte (III)
Winners (2): 2011–12, 2018–19

Landesliga Steiermark (IV)
Winners (1): 2017–18

Oberliga Mitte/West (V)
Winners (1): 2016–17

Unterliga Mitte (VI)
Winners (1): 2015–16

Gebietsliga Mitte (VII)
Winners (1): 2014–15

1. Klasse Mitte A (VIII)
Winners (1): 2013–14

References

External links

official homepage

 
Association football clubs established in 1902
Football clubs in Austria
1902 establishments in Austria